Bill Bossio (February 23, 1928 – September 16, 2016) was an American boxer. He competed in the men's bantamweight event at the 1948 Summer Olympics. At the 1948 Summer Olympics, he lost to Jean-Marie Grenot of France.

References

External links
 

1928 births
2016 deaths
American male boxers
Olympic boxers of the United States
Boxers at the 1948 Summer Olympics
Boxers from Pittsburgh
Bantamweight boxers